The Carnegie Foundation is an organization based in The Hague, Netherlands. It was founded in 1903 by Andrew Carnegie in order to manage his donation of US$1.5 million, which was used for the construction, management and maintenance of the Peace Palace. The Peace Palace was built to house the Permanent Court of Arbitration and a library of international law.

The foundation became the legal owner of the Peace Palace because the Permanent Court of Arbitration, which is based there along with its library, could not own the building under Dutch law.

The foundation has five Dutch board members, of whom four are chosen by the Dutch monarch and one by the Supervisory Board of the Permanent Court of Arbitration. The current chairman of the Carnegie Foundation is Bernard Bot.

Since 1931, the foundation has been entrusted with the annual awarding of the Wateler Peace Prize.

The Carnegie Foundation is a member of the Hague Academic Coalition. This is a consortium of institutions in the fields of international relations, international law and international development, based in The Hague. The Carnegie Foundation is one of the founding partners of The Hague Institute for Global Justice, a recently-closed research institute in The Hague.

References

External links
The Peace Palace and Carnegie Foundation website
List of chairmen
Hague Justice Portal: Carnegie Foundation 

Andrew Carnegie
Foundations based in the Netherlands
Charities based in the Netherlands
Organisations based in The Hague
1903 establishments in the Netherlands
Organizations established in 1903